Lutheran High School West, also known as Lutheran West, is a private college-prep Christian co-ed high school in Rocky River, Ohio, United States, serving Cleveland and Northeast Ohio families since 1958.

History 
In 1946, sixteen Lutheran congregations formally met to establish an association and resolved to establish a Lutheran high school in Cleveland, Ohio. The result was the founding of the Cleveland Lutheran High School Association (CLHSA). In 1948, Lutheran West's precursor, Lutheran High School, was built in the east side of Cleveland. In 1958, that school's property was acquired by the state of Ohio for construction of Interstate 90, and the CLHSA decided to build two high schools: Lutheran High School West and Lutheran High School East, located in Cleveland Heights.

Demographics
The demographic breakdown of the 445 students enrolled for 2017-18 was:
Native American/Alaskan - 0.4%
Asian - 4.5%
Black - 5.6%
Hispanic - 9.7%
White - 70.8%
Multiracial - 9.0%

Notable alumni
 Nickie Antonio, politician
 Tim Gettinger, professional hockey player in the National Hockey League (NHL)
 Mike Clum, entrepreneur & video producer

References

External links 
 
Cleveland Lutheran High School Association website

High schools in Cuyahoga County, Ohio
Lutheran schools in Ohio
Private high schools in Ohio
Secondary schools affiliated with the Lutheran Church–Missouri Synod